Richard Bunn is managing director of rbi network, Geneva, a consulting firm for television, sport and marketing, established in 2000.

During 1978-2000 he was Head of Television Programmes and Controller of Sport at European Broadcasting Union. He was instrumental in partnership of the European Athletic Association with EBU and British Satellite Broadcasting, which eventually led to the creation of the Eurosport.

The International DanceSport Federation (IDSF)  credits the creation of the Eurovision Dance Contest to  Mr. Bunn, who convinced the  EBU  to create this TV program.

In 2001, Richard Bunn was awarded the Olympic Order by the IOC for his efforts in promoting sports:
"responsible for negotiating major contracts with the International Federations and overseeing the coordination of the Olympic Movement with the EBU for the past 22 years."

References

Year of birth missing (living people)
Living people
Sports executives and administrators
Television executives
Recipients of the Olympic Order